Postell is a surname. Notable people with the surname include:

Ashley Postell (born 1986), American gymnast
James Postell Douglas (1836-1901), American politician and businessman
Lavor Postell (born 1978), American basketball player
Richard Postell (died 1400), British Christian canon and dean

See also
Postel, surname